Dawlish Warren railway station serves the seaside resort and holiday camps of Dawlish Warren in Devon, England, at the mouth of the River Exe.

From here to Teignmouth, the railway runs along the sea wall.

History

This was not on the site of the present station, but nearer to the Sea Wall by the footbridge which had been built across the line in 1873. An iron 'pagoda' waiting shelter was provided on each -long platform. From 1 July 1907 the station was staffed and renamed 'Warren Platform. It was provided with a booking office and larger waiting room by adding larger iron buildings alongside the original 'pagodas'.

Work soon started on a new station. A goods yard was opened on 10 June 1912 on the landward side of the line, and the new station, now  nearer to Starcross, was opened to passengers on 23 September 1912. It had been intended to move the iron buildings from the old platform but instead larger wooden buildings were provided. Between 1 January 1917 and 5 May 1919 the station was temporarily closed due to World War I. The building on the 'Down' platform (nearest the beach) was destroyed by fire on 9 January 1924.

In 1935 a camp coach was stationed in the goods yard which could be rented by holiday makers but the facility was withdrawn in 1939. Camping coaches were reintroduced by the Western Region in 1952, and by 1963 there were nine coaches stationed here. After 1964 the public camp coach service was withdrawn but the coaches at Dawlish Warren continued to be managed by the British Rail Staff Association for its members. The old coaches were replaced for the 1982 season by the current vehicles, since when the connection to the goods yard has been removed.

The Great Western Railway was nationalised into British Railways on 1 January 1948. Goods traffic was withdrawn on 5 August 1967 and on 3 May 1971 the station became unstaffed.  From 1974 to 1984 the buildings on the Up side housed the Dawlish Warren Railway Museum with its model railway. This building too burnt down in 2003, but in 2007 a new residential building was built on the site which is outwardly the same design as the former Dawlish Warren signal box. This had been located at the north end of the 'Down' platform until made redundant on 14 November 1986 by the West of England resignalling; it was demolished in May 1990.

Platform layout 
There are four tracks through the station with platforms on the outer pair which allows fast trains to overtake trains stopped at the station. Trains towards  use the platform nearest the beach, which is only a few yards away.

The station has step-free access to both platforms. A narrow and low bridge beneath the line immediately south of the station allows access between the platforms.

Location
Behind the westbound platform is a golf course and the salt marsh and dunes that make up the Dawlish Warren National Nature Reserve.

Services

Dawlish Warren is served by Great Western Railway trains in both directions on an approximately hourly basis during the day. The route from Exeter St Davids through Dawlish Warren to Paignton is marketed as the Riviera Line.

A few trains run between Bristol,  and beyond; otherwise, passengers travelling east or north change into main line trains at Exeter St Davids, or at Newton Abbot if travelling westwards. The outside lines can accommodate an eight-carriage Great Western Railway service, but only selected doors are able to open due to the short platform.

On summer Saturdays, there are three direct services from London Paddington to Paignton calling at Dawlish Warren with three return services. On Sundays, there are no services to/from London; passengers to/from London have to change at Exeter St Davids.

References

Further reading

External links
 Dawlish Warren camping coaches

Railway stations in Devon
Railway stations in Great Britain opened in 1912
Railway stations in Great Britain closed in 1917
Railway stations in Great Britain opened in 1919
Former Great Western Railway stations
Railway stations served by Great Western Railway
1912 establishments in England
Dawlish
DfT Category F2 stations